Tihonet Pond is an  pond in Wareham, Massachusetts. The Wankinco River flows through the pond. Tihonet village lies on the southern shore of the pond.
Environmental Protection Agency

Wareham, Massachusetts
Ponds of Plymouth County, Massachusetts
Ponds of Massachusetts